Chase Joynt is a Canadian filmmaker, writer, video artist, actor, and professor. He attracted acclaim as co-director with Aisling Chin-Yee of the documentary film No Ordinary Man (2020), and as director of the film Framing Agnes (2022). He won two awards at the 2022 Sundance Film Festival for his work on the latter.

Career

Filmmaking 
Joynt has directed a number of short documentary films about gender issues, including I'm Yours (2012), Akin (2012), Stealth (2014), Between You and Me (2016) and a short film version of Framing Agnes (2019).

He won the Emerging Canadian Artist award at the 2012 Inside Out Film and Video Festival for Akin; in the same year, he had an acting role in John Greyson's web series Murder in Passing.

In 2020 he received a grant from Inside Out's Re:Focus Emergency Relief Fund for the completion of a feature film edition of Framing Agnes, which later premiered at the 2022 Sundance Film Festival, where Joynt won both the Audience Award and the Innovator Prize in the NEXT program.

Writing 
In 2016, Joynt and Mike Hoolboom coauthored the non-fiction book You Only Live Twice: Sex, Death and Transition. The book received a Lambda Literary Award nomination for Transgender Non-Fiction at the 29th Lambda Literary Awards in 2017.

Teaching 
Since 2019, Joynt has been an assistant professor of gender studies at the University of Victoria.

Personal life 
Joynt is a trans man.

References

External links

21st-century Canadian non-fiction writers
21st-century Canadian male writers
Canadian male non-fiction writers
Canadian documentary film directors
Canadian video artists
Canadian LGBT artists
Transgender artists
Canadian transgender writers
Academic staff of the University of Victoria
Living people
Transgender academics
Year of birth missing (living people)
21st-century Canadian LGBT people
Transgender screenwriters
Canadian LGBT academics